Black Car or variant thereof, may refer to:

Music
 Black Cars (1985 album), album by Gino Vannelli
 BlackCar (2003 album), album by the eponymous British rock band 'BlackCar'
 BlackCar (rock band), British rock band

Songs
 Black Car (2019 song), a song from the soundtrack album for Drive (2019 film)
 Black Car (2018 song), a song by 'Beach House' off their album 7 (Beach House album)
 Black Car (Miriam Bryant song), 2016 song by Miriam Bryant off the album Bye Bye Blue
 Black Car (1996 song), a song by 'Quintaine Americana'

Vehicles
 black car, the title character of the 1977 horror film "The Car"
 "Black Car", a 1930s race car driven by St John Horsfall
 "The Black Car", a 2019 special edition built by Bugatti Automobiles
 Black Prince, a British 4 wheeled cyclecar
 Hackney carriage, the London black taxi cars
 black car, the call-cabs of New York City, see Taxicabs of New York City

Other uses
 black car service, a car service providing limousines
 Black Car Service, a subsidiary of Transdev

See also

 "New Black Car" (2002 song), song off the album Swim by 'July for Kings'
 "Big Black Car" (1985 song), song by 'Big Star' off the album Third/Sister Lovers
 "Big Black Car" (2006 song), song by Dave Palmer off the album Romance (Dave Palmer album)
 Big Black Car, a house improv comedy team at Peoples Improv Theater
 Hearse
 Limousine
 Black Maria police van
 U.S. G-man black Chevrolet Suburbans
 Black (disambiguation)
 Car (disambiguation)